Marilú Marini (born 15 June 1945) is an Argentine actress. She frequently works with French filmmaker Claire Denis. She received the Diamond Konex Award in 2021 as the most important person in Entertainment in the last decade in Argentina.

Selected filmography
 Violanta (1976)
 The Games of Countess Dolingen (1981)
 Les Nanas (1985), directed by Annick Lanoë
 Trouble Every Day (2001), directed by Claire Denis
 Musée haut, musée bas (2008), directed by Jean-Michel Ribes
 The Sleepwalkers (2019)

Nominations
 2013 Martín Fierro Awards
 Best actress of miniseries

References

1945 births
Living people
Argentine actresses